To Each His Own is a studio album by Frankie Laine released in 1968 on ABC Records.

Track listing

Charts

References 

1968 albums
Frankie Laine albums
ABC Records albums
Albums produced by Bob Thiele